San Giovanni is an underground interchange station on Lines A and C of the Rome Metro.

The station is located in Piazzale Appio at the beginning of Via Appia Nuova, beside the Basilica di San Giovanni in Laterano, from which the station takes its name.

It opened in 1980 on Line A. On May 12, 2018, Line C was extended to the station. It serves as the westernmost terminus of Line C, pending its extension to Fori Imperiali, which is currently under construction.

Located nearby 
 Lateran Palace
 Basilica of St. John Lateran
 Santa Croce in Gerusalemme
 Porta San Giovanni
 Porta Asinaria

Interchanges 
   Interchange station for Line A and Line C on the Rome Metro.
  3 (Tram Line) - 16 - 51 - 77 - 81 - 85 - 87 - 218 - 360 - 665 - 792 - NMA - NMC - N3S

References

External links 

Rome Metro Line A stations
Rome Metro Line C stations
Railway stations opened in 1980
1980 establishments in Italy
Rome Q. IX Appio-Latino
Railway stations in Italy opened in the 20th century